Ramalic acid is an organic compound with the molecular formula C18H18O7. Ramalic acid occurs as a secondary metabolite in some lichens like Ramalina pollinaria wherfrom ramalic acid has its name. Ramalic acid can be used as a dye.

References

Further reading 

 

Polyphenols